The Serbian Ombudsman (Заштитник грађана / Zaštitnik građana in Serbian, literally meaning "Protector of Citizens") is an independent institution of the Government of Serbia, responsible for investigating and addressing complaints made by citizens against other government institutions.

The Serbian Ombudsman was established in 2006 after the ratification of the country's current constitution. The first ombudsman was Saša Janković, elected on 14 June 2007 and re-elected on 4 August 2012. The ombudsman is appointed for a five-year term by the National Assembly, to which it reports every year or at their request.

The ombudsman is not allowed to hold any other public or professional function. The ombudsman is aided by four deputies (Заменици / Zamenici) specialised in legal domains such as Children’s Rights and Gender Equality, Rights of Persons with Disabilities, Rights of National Minorities and Rights of Persons Deprived of Liberty.

The current ombudsman is Zoran Pašalić, elected on 20 July 2017, with the votes of 142 MPs. The current deputies are Gordana Stevanović (Children’s Rights and Gender Equality), Vladana Jović (Rights of Persons with Disabilities), Robert Sepi (Rights of National Minorities) and Miloš R. Janković (Protection of Rights of Persons Deprived of Liberty and Head of the National Preventive Mechanism against Torture), elected on 26 November 2013. The office of the ombudsman is in Belgrade, at 16  (in Savski Venac).

List of officeholders 
Source: 

 Status

References

External links 
 Serbian Ombudsman – official site

Legal organizations based in Serbia
Government of Serbia
Ombudsman posts
2006 establishments in Serbia